Melukavu (Melukavumattom) is a village in the eastern part of Meenachil Taluk in Kottayam District of Kerala state, India.

Tourism
The place is a major tourist attraction for nature lovers with beautiful hills, streams and rubber plantations that forms a green blanket to the place. The famous tourist spot is Ilaveezha Poonchira.
Illickal Kallu is another major tourist attraction in Kottayam district. Even though it is in Moonnilavu panchayath, it is near to Melukavu.

Film shooting venue
The plot of the famous Malayalam film Katha Parayumpol (Year-2007,Starring:Mammootty, Sreenivasan) was set in kurisinkal – the backdrop of Melukavu village.
The movie Parudeesa was shot in Erumapra and the movie Swapnam Kondu Thulabharam was set in the scenic beauty of the Melukavu.

Geography
Melukavu is in the eastern part of Kottayam district and borders with Idukki district on its North-East and North. It shares its borders with Kudayathoor Panchayat in North-East and Muttom Panchayat in North (both are in Idukki district).
Bharananganam and Kadanadu Panchayats are in West and Moonnilavu Panchayat is in East. The Southern side borders with Thalappalam Panchayat.

Melukavu is at the fringe of the Western Ghats. The place is situated in an ecologically fragile hill terrain which is prone to landslides during monsoon. Melukavu was the epicentre of the earthquake that recorded 5 in Richter scale on 12 December 2000 at 06:53 AM local time resulting in some damage to properties in Kottayam and Idukki districts. There are many streams and brooks originating from Melukavu hills and flow southwards through Edamaruku to join Meenachil River at Erattupetta.

Transportation
Melukavu is well connected by roads to nearby towns Erattupetta(12 km), Palai(16 km), Thodupuzha(18 km).The state highway SH-44 connecting Pampa(Sabarimala) to Neriyamangalam(Thodupuzha) passes through Melukavu.

There are no railway line passing through Melukavu. The nearest major railway station is in Kottayam (50 km).

The nearest airport is Cochin International Airport at a distance of 70 kilometres.

Demographics
 India census, Melukavu had a population of 9352 with 4578 males and 4774 females.

Educational institutions

Places of worship

 St.John's c.s.I church chemmala

See also
Neeloor
Muttom, Thodupuzha
Kollappally

References

Villages in Kottayam district